Pterostylis allantoidea, commonly known as the shy greenhood, is a species of orchid which is endemic to the south-west of Western Australia. It has a large rosette of leaves at the base of a flowering spike and a single white flower with green or reddish-brown stripes.

Description
Pterostylis allantoidea, is a terrestrial,  perennial, deciduous, herb with an underground tuber and which usually grows in colonies. When flowering, there is usually only a single, white flower with green or reddish-brown stripes. The dorsal sepal and petals form a hood over the column. Flowering occurs from August to September.

Taxonomy and naming
Pterostylis allantoidea was first formally described in 1940 by Richard Sanders Rogers in Transactions of the Royal Society of South Australia. The specific epithet (allantoidea) is from the Latin allantoideus, 'sausage-shaped', referring to the shape of the labellum.

Distribution and habitat
The shy greenhood grows on and near granite outcrops under shrubs between Coolgardie, Ravensthorpe and Israelite Bay  in the Coolgardie and Esperance Plains biogeographic regions of Western Australia.

Conservation status
Pterostylis allantoidea is classified as "not threatened" by the Government of Western Australia Department of Parks and Wildlife.

References

allantoidea
Endemic orchids of Australia
Orchids of Western Australia
Plants described in 1940
Endemic flora of Western Australia